is a retired Japanese figure skater. She is the 2007 and 2011 World champion, 2011 Four Continents champion, 2004 World Junior champion, and a three-time (2003, 2004 & 2010) Japanese national champion.

Ando is the first female skater to complete a quadruple jump successfully in competition. She accomplished this at the 2002–03 Junior Grand Prix Final in The Hague, Netherlands.

Personal life
Ando was born on December 18, 1987 in Nagoya, Aichi Prefecture. Her father died in a traffic accident when she was eight years old. In 2006, Ando joined Toyota and also entered Chukyo University as an adult learner, from which she graduated in March 2011. She learned English during her time training in the U.S. In January 2013, she left Toyota Motor.

Ando gave birth to a daughter, Himawari ("sunflower" in Japanese), in April 2013.

Career

Early career 
Ando began skating in 1996 at the age of eight. Her first coach was Rina Horie. Yuko Monna, whose students at that time included Mao Asada and Mai Asada, soon began teaching Ando. Beginning in the 2000–01 season, she was coached by Nobuo Satō, and her program already featured a 3Lz-3Lo.

Making her junior international debut, Ando won both of her 2001–02 ISU Junior Grand Prix (JGP) assignments and qualified for the JGP Final, where she also won gold. Nationally, she became the Japanese junior champion and senior bronze medalist. She concluded her season with bronze at the 2002 World Junior Championships.

Ando won both of her 2002–03 JGP assignments. At the JGP Final, she became the first female skater to land a quad jump of any kind in a competition, performing a 4S on her way to the bronze medal. She remained the only woman ever to perform this feat until January 2018, when junior skater Alexandra Trusova ratified the same jump in competition. That season she defended her national Junior crown and took silver at the World Junior Championships.

Ando was prominent in 2003–04, winning all her junior competitions including the Junior Grand Prix Final, her third consecutive national junior title, and the Junior Worlds. She also won the Japan Championships (senior) and placed 4th at her first senior World Championships.

2004–05 season 
The 2004–05 season was her first full season as a senior skater. She won two medals in the ISU Grand Prix of Figure Skating series and qualified for the Grand Prix Final, where she placed fourth. She won her second national senior title and placed sixth at 2005 Worlds.

2005–06 season 
Ando relocated to the United States to train with Carol Heiss Jenkins in preparation for the 2005–06 season which included the 2006 Winter Olympics in Torino. The season began well, when she won the silver medal at the 2005 Cup of Russia, but she finished 4th at the 2005 NHK Trophy and narrowly qualified for the Grand Prix Final, where she placed 4th. At Japanese Nationals, she placed 6th.

Ando was named to the Japanese Olympic team in accordance with the criteria that were to include two seasons into consideration. At the Olympics, she placed 15th, after falling three times in her free skate, once on her quad attempt. She was not placed on the team to the World Championships the following month.

2006–07 season 

Ando changed coaches again for the 2006–07 season. Training with her new coach, Nikolai Morozov, Ando won gold at the 2006 Skate America and silver at the 2006 Trophée Eric Bompard. She qualified for the Grand Prix Final, where she placed 5th. It was later revealed that Ando, along with the rest of the Japanese team, competed in Saint Petersburg while suffering stomach flu.

At the Japanese Nationals, Ando dislocated her shoulder while performing a spin in her free skate but skated on to place second overall behind Mao Asada.

At the 2007 Worlds, Ando placed second in both the short program and the free skate, and scored a total of 195.09 points to win the World Championship by less than one point over Asada. Ando set new personal bests in both the short program and the free skate, and a new personal best total score. She was named one of Vogue Japan's "Women of the Year for 2007" and received six other awards including the "most valuable mention" from the Japanese Olympic Committee.

2007–08 season 
Ando's 2007–08 season began with a silver medal at the 2007 Skate America but placed fourth at the 2007 NHK Trophy, where she fell three times in her free skate. She did not qualify for the Grand Prix Final. At the Japan Championships, she won the free skate to place second overall, again behind Asada.

In the following February, Ando competed for the first time at Four Continents, where she attempted a 4S but popped it to a double. She won the bronze medal. At Worlds, Ando was 8th after the short program and was forced to withdraw during her free skate due to a leg muscle strain she had been suffering since that morning.

2008–09 season 
In the 2008–09 Grand Prix season, Ando placed third after Yuna Kim and Yukari Nakano at Skate America and placed second, behind Kim, again, at the Cup of China. At the Grand Prix Final, Ando stayed on her foot after an attempted 4S in her free skate program, the first time in competition since 2004, though the rotations were not considered enough and the jump was downgraded. Despite her last place finish, Ando stated that she was very happy with her performance, and that she would continue to work on her 4S.

At the Japan Championships, she was in 3rd place after the short program. During the free skate warm-up, she collided with Fumie Suguri, and injured her knee. She placed third and earned one of Japan's three spots at the 2009 World Championships. Before the event, the Japanese skating federation wanted her to leave Morozov. There, she won the bronze medal with a total of 190.38 after placing fourth in the short program and second in the free program.

Ando represented Japan in a team competition, 2009 ISU World Team Trophy, in Tokyo, Japan, where she placed 3rd at the short program, 6th at the free skate and 5th overall. Team Japan was placed 3rd, winning the bronze medal.

2009–10 season 
The Japan Skating Federation set, as one of its criteria for choosing the skaters to send to the 2010 Winter Olympics, the highest Japanese medal finisher at the Grand Prix Final. With this in mind, Ando competed at Rostelecom Cup; she placed third in the short program and won the free skate to win the competition overall. At the NHK Trophy, she placed second in both segments and first overall. The two wins qualified Ando for the Grand Prix Final.

At this GP Final in Tokyo, Ando placed first in the short program, 0.56 points ahead of second-place finisher Yuna Kim, and second in the free skate. She was awarded the silver medal behind Kim but ahead of the bronze medalist Akiko Suzuki. With this result, she earned a spot in Japan's Olympic team despite placing fourth at the Japanese Championships.

In February 2010, Ando competed at the 2010 Winter Olympics in Vancouver, British Columbia, Canada. In the short program, she executed a 3Lz-3L combination but the 3L was downgraded. She earned levels 3 and 4 on spins. Ranked fourth in the short program and sixth in the free skate, she finished fifth overall. Although she originally intended to miss the 2010–11 season, she changed her mind following the Olympics.

At the 2010 World Championships, she finished fourth overall after placing eleventh in the short – having fallen on her opening 3Lz – and third in the free.

2010–11 season 
Ando was assigned to Cup of China and the Rostelecom Cup for the 2010–11 Grand Prix season. In August, shortly before the beginning of the season, she changed her training base while abroad from Hackensack, New Jersey, USA, to Daugavpils, Latvia. She was originally said to have intended to move to Russia, but this plan had to be changed due to the smog and heat wave in Moscow.

At Cup of China, Ando attempted a 3Lz-3L combination in the short program, but the loop was deemed underrotated by the technical panel, and she placed third in this segment. She won the free skate segment with a clean performance and won the event overall, ahead of silver medalist Akiko Suzuki and bronze medalist Alena Leonova.

Ando competed with a back injury at Rostelecom Cup after a collision with Abzal Rakimgaliev, from Kazakhstan, earlier in the week in practice. An underrotated 3F in the short program left her in 5th place after the short program but she placed first in the long program, winning the gold medal ahead of silver medalist Suzuki and bronze medalist Ashley Wagner.

With two gold medals in the Grand Prix circuit, Ando qualified for the Grand Prix Final in Beijing, where she performed her renewed short program that was completed only a week prior. Mistakes on two jumps left her in 5th place following the short program. She ranked first in the free skate but it was not enough to make up the gap from the short program, and she stayed 5th overall.

On December 26, Ando won her third Japanese National title over silver medalist Mao Asada and bronze medalist Kanako Murakami, and these three were nominated into the Japanese team for the World Championships, which at the time were scheduled to be held in Tokyo in March 2011. At the Four Continents Championships in February, Ando placed first in both the short program and free skating segments to win the competition overall. Her total score of 201.34 was a season's and personal best.

Ando won the gold medal at the World Championships in Moscow, Russia, beating silver medalist Yuna Kim by 1.29 points and bronze medalist Carolina Kostner by 11.11 points.

2011–12 season 
In June, it was reported that Ando would sit out the 2011–12 Grand Prix series. She later decided not to compete all season, and in ISU events she appeared only once as an invited skater in the exhibition of the World Team Trophy. Instead, Ando participated in numerous shows worldwide, and among them, a benefit event for the victims of the earthquake and tsunami of March 11, 2011, called "Reborn Garden", was planned, co-choreographed and co-produced by Ando herself. The characteristic choreography by Ando and Tsurutani is to a non-stop sequence of various music assembled into one story scene, similar to a ballet program.

2012–13 season 
Ando was assigned to the 2012 Cup of China and 2012 Trophee Eric Bompard. In May, Ando said she was uncertain if she was ready to return to competition but she had to sign a commitment. In October, she withdrew from both events because she was unable to find a permanent coach. At the end of the same month, Ando learned she was pregnant. She gave birth in April 2013 to a baby girl and resumed training a month later.

2013–14 season 
After two years away from competition and five months after giving birth, Ando appeared at the 2013 Nebelhorn Trophy and won the silver medal behind Russian senior debutant Elena Radionova. Following her seventh-place finish at the 2014 Nationals, Ando announced her retirement from competitive skating and said that she intended to pursue a coaching career.

Post-competitive 
Ando has worked for Japanese television and begun coaching. She was also a main cast member at the annual touring ice show Fantasy on Ice, having participated in all editions from 2010 to 2019. In 2013, she performed in a live music collaboration with singer Ai to the song "To mama", after giving birth to her daughter Himawari.

Programs

Post–2014

Pre–2014

Competitive highlights
GP: Grand Prix; JGP: Junior Grand Prix

Detailed results

Small medals for short program and free skating awarded only at ISU Championships.

 QR: Qualification round

References

External links 

  
 

1987 births
Figure skaters at the 2006 Winter Olympics
Japanese female single skaters
Living people
Olympic figure skaters of Japan
Figure skaters from Nagoya
Figure skaters at the 2010 Winter Olympics
World Figure Skating Championships medalists
Four Continents Figure Skating Championships medalists
World Junior Figure Skating Championships medalists
Fantasy on Ice main cast members